Shams al-Din (IPA: /ʃamsaddiːn/) ( "sun of the faith") is an Arabic personal name or title.

Notable persons with this name are:

10th–13th century
Shams al-Din Altınapa, Seljuk atabeg
Muhammad ibn Ahmad Shams al-Din al-Maqdisi (c. 945–1000), Arab geographer
Shams al-Din Muhammad bin Ali, or Suzani Samarqandi (died 1166), Persian poet
Shams al-Din Ildeniz (died ), atabeg of Azerbaijan
Shams al-Din Muhammad ibn al-Muqaddam ( century), Zengid governor of Damascus and Ayyubid emir of Baalbek
Shams-ud-din Iltutmish (died 1236), Muslim Turkic sultan of Delhi
Shamsuddin Sabzwari (died 1247), Sufi missionary  in southern Punjab
Shams al-Din Muhammad, or Shams Tabrizi (died 1248), Persian Sufi mystic
Shams al-Din Lu'lu' al-Amini (died 1251), regent of Aleppo
Shams al-Din 'Ali ibn Mas'ud (died 1255), Mihrabanid malik of Sistan
Ajall Shams al-Din Omar (1211–1279), provincial governor of Yunnan
Shams al-Dīn Abū Al-ʿAbbās Aḥmad Ibn Muḥammad Ibn Khallikān (1211–1282), Iraqi Shafi'i Islamic scholar
Shams al-Din Juvayni (died 1285) vizier and sahib-divan under three Mongol Ilkhans
Shams al-Din Muhammad ibn Mahmud al-Shahrazuri (died c. 1290), Kurdish physician and historian

14th–17th century
Shams al-Din Muhammad (1257–1310), imam of the Nizari Isma'ili community
Shams al-Din al-Samarqandi (c. 1250 – c. 1310), astronomer and mathematician from Samarkand
Shamsuddin Firuz Shah (died 1322), sultan of the Bengali kingdom of Lakhnauti
Shams al-Din al-Ansari al-Dimashqi (1256–1327), Arab geographer
Shams-ud-Din Shah Mir (died 1342), ruler of Kashmir
 Ali Shams al-Din I (died 1348), leader of the Tayyibi Isma'ili community
Shams al-Din ibn Fazl Allah (died c. 1348), leader of the Sarbadars of Sabzewar
Khwaja Shams al-Din 'Ali (died c. 1352), leader of the Sarbadars of Sabzewar
Shams ud din, or Shams Tabraiz (missionary) (died 1356), Ismaili saint in India
Shamsuddin Ilyas Shah (died 1358), sultan of Bengal
Shams al-Din Ibn Muflih (died 1361), authority on Hanbali Law
Shams ud-Din Amir Kulal (died 1370), tribal head, scholar and religious figure in Turkistan
Shams al-Din Abu Abd Allah al-Khalili (1320–1380), Syrian astronomer
Shams al-Din al-Kirmani (died c. 1385), Sunni scholar
Khwaja Shams al-Din Muhammad Hafez-e Shirazi (1315–1390), Persian lyric poet
 Ali Shams al-Din II (died 1428), leader of the Tayyibi Isma'ili community
Shams al-Din al-Fanari (1350–1431), Turkish logician, Islamic theologian, and Islamic legal academic
Shamsuddin Ahmad Shah (died 1435), ruler of Bengal
Shams al-Din 'Ali ibn Qutb al-Din (c. 1387 – c. 1438), Mihrabanid malik of Sistan
Shamsuddin Yusuf Shah (died 1481), ruler of Bengal
Shamsuddin Muhammad Shah III (died 1482), sultan of Bahmani
Shams ad-Din ibn Muhammad (died 1487), sultan of Adal
Shamsuddin Muzaffar Shah (died 1494), Abyssinian sultan of Bengal
Shams al-Din Muhammad (died c. 1494), Mihrabanid malik of Sistan
Shams al-Din Muhammad ibn `Abd al-Rahman al-Sakhawi (1428–1497), Egyptian Islamic scholar
Mir Shams-ud-Din Araqi (died 1526), Sufi Shi'a missionary in Kashmir
 Ali Shams al-Din III (died 1527), leader of the Tayyibi Isma'ili community
Shamsuddin Muhammad Ataga Khan (died 1562), minister in Mughal court
Khawaja Shamsuddin Khawafi (died 1600), minister to Emperor Akbar

18th century–present
Shamseddin Amir-Alaei (1900–1994), Iranian politician and diplomat
Muhammad Shamsuddeen III (1879–1935), Sultan of the Maldives
Şemsettin Günaltay (1883–1961) prime minister of Turkey
Şemsettin Mardin, Turkish diplomat
Abul Kalam Shamsuddin (1897–1978), Bengali journalist and politician
Abu Jafar Shamsuddin (1911–1989), Bangladeshi author and novelist
Khwaja Shams-ud-Din (1922–1999), Prime Minister of Jammu and Kashmir
Shamsuddin Abul Kalam (1926–1997), Bangladeshi author and novelist
Shamsuddin Qasemi (1935–1996), Bangladeshi Islamic scholar and politician
Nasri Shamseddine (1927–1983), Lebanese singer and actor
A. T. M. Shamsuddin (born 1927), Bangladeshi author
Khwaja Shamsuddin Azeemi (born 1927), patriarch of the Sufi Order of Azeemia
Mohammad Mehdi Shamseddine (1936–2001), Lebanese Twelver Shia Islamic scholar
Shamsodin Vaezi (born 1936), Iraqi Twelver Shi'a Marja
Abdul Aziz Shamsuddin (born 1938), Malaysian politician
Shamsuddeen Usman (born 1949), Nigerian politician
Semezdin Mehmedinović (born 1960), Bosnian writer
Chettithody Shamshuddin (born 1970), Indian cricket umpire
Shamsuddin Amiri (born 1985), Afghan footballer
 Şemseddin Sami Efendi, pen-name of Sami Frashëri (1850–1904), Albanian writer, philosopher and playwright
Ashari Samsudin (born 1985), Malaysian footballer

References

Arabic masculine given names